Frederick A. Butters (1904–1988) was an English professional rugby league footballer who played in the 1920s and 1930s.

Background
Fred Butters was born in Pendlebury, Lancashire, England, and he died aged 84.

Playing career

International honours
Fred Butters, won a cap for England while at Swinton in 1932 against Wales, and won caps for Great Britain while at Swinton in 1929-30 against Australia (2 matches).

County Cup Final appearances
Fred Butters played  in Swinton's 8-10 defeat by Salford in the 1931 Lancashire County Cup Final during the 1931–32 season at The Cliff, Broughton, Salford on Saturday 21 November 1931.

References

External links

1904 births
1988 deaths
England national rugby league team players
English rugby league players
Great Britain national rugby league team players
People from Pendlebury
Place of death missing
Rugby league locks
Rugby league players from Lancashire
Swinton Lions players